Malësi e Madhe District, commonly known as Malësia, was one of the 36 districts of Albania, which were dissolved in July 2000 and replaced by 12 newly created counties. It is in the north of the country, and its capital was the town of Koplik.

Administrative divisions
The district consisted of the following municipalities:

Gruemirë
Kastrat
Kelmend
Koplik
Qendër
Shkrel

Note: - urban municipalities in bold

References

Districts of Albania
Geography of Shkodër County